Athletic Bilbao is a Spanish football club. This article contains historical and current statistics and records pertaining to the club.

Records 

 One of the three clubs that have never been relegated from La Liga, along with Barcelona and Real Madrid.
 Five-time La Liga and Copa del Rey winner in the same season.
 First team to be permanently awarded the original Liga trophy.
 Won La Liga unbeaten (1929–30 season, joint record).
 Record for biggest Liga win, Athletic Bilbao 12–1 Barcelona (1930–31 season).
 Record for most goals scored in a league match (includes both sides), 14 with Athletic Bilbao 9–5 Racing Santander (1932–33 season).
 Record for most goals scored in a league match as visitors, Osasuna 1–8 Athletic Bilbao (1958–59 season, joint record).
 Record for a draw with the most goals in a league match, Atlético 6–6 Athletic Bilbao (1949–50 season).
 All-time La Liga top goalscorers (as a fraction) in a season (home); with 5.44 goals per match (1930–31 season).
 All-time La Liga goalscorer (as a fraction) in a season (away); with 3.11 goals per match (1931–32 season).
 All-time La Liga goalscorer (as a fraction) in a season; with 4.06 goals per match (1930–31 season).
 Biggest away victories (in percentages) in a season with 8 out of 9, 89% (1932–33 season).
 Biggest number of away points (percentage) in a season with 16 out of 18, 89% (1932–33 season).
 Of the current Primera División teams, heaviest defeats inflicted at home ground against Barcelona, Real Betis, Espanyol and Celta Vigo (also Sporting Gijón, Zaragoza, Tenerife, Salamanca, Mérida and Lleida).
 Of the current Primera División teams, heaviest La Liga defeats inflicted away against Barcelona (0–6), Real Madrid (0–6), Espanyol (1–5) and Osasuna (1–8).
 Leading goalscorer in a single league match, Bata: seven goals (Athletic Bilbao 12–1 Barcelona, 1930–31 season, joint record).
 Player with most appearances in La Liga: Zubizarreta, 622 (the first 169 matches with Athletic Bilbao).
 Team with greatest number of Copa del Rey final appearances (disputed): 35.
 Four permanently awarded league trophies (joint record).
 Most goals scored in a Copa del Rey competition: 12 against Celta Vigo.
 Player with most Copa del Rey final wins: Agustín Gaínza, 7.
 Players with most Copa del Rey finals (disputed): Agustín Gaínza and Jose Mari Belauste, both have 9 confirmed wins.
 All-time leading goalscorer in the history of the Copa del Rey: Telmo Zarra, 81 goals.
 Leading goalscorer in a Copa del Rey match: Agustín Gaínza, eight goals (Athletic Bilbao 12–1 Celta Vigo, 1946–47 season).
 Player with most Copa del Rey matches: Agustín Gaínza, 99.

Extended honours

Titles

(*) International friendly tournaments not included.

Notes

Awards
 Amberes Trophy (2): 1953, 1959
 Martini&Rossi Trophy (1): 1956
 Pichichi Trophy (12): 1930, 1931, 1932, 1940, 1945, 1946, 1947, 1950, 1951, 1953, 1968, 1975.
 Zamora Trophy (6): 1930, 1934, 1936, 1941, 1947, 1970.

Players 

Games only include professional matches. Substitute appearances are included. Statistics for current players are updated continuously throughout the year. Players are listed according to the date of their first-team debut for the club.

Most appearances

Top goalscorers

Player league records

Pichichi winners

The Pichichi Trophy is an award given by the Spanish newspaper Marca to the top scorer at the end of the league season.

Ricardo Zamora Trophy 

The Ricardo Zamora Trophy is an award established by Spanish newspaper Marca in 1958. The award goes to the goalkeeper who has the lowest "goals-to-games" ratio. The list also includes retrospective winners under the same rules before the trophy was introduced.

Zarra Trophy 

The Zarra Trophy is an award established by Spanish newspaper Marca in 2006. The award goes to the top scorer of Spanish nationality (born or acquired). The list also includes retrospective winners under the same rules before the trophy was introduced.

Trajectory

League career 

 Data obtained from the official club website.

League final positions

Biggest wins

League

Cup

Europe

Footnotes

A.  The "Europe" column constitutes goals and appearances in the UEFA Competitions.
B.  The "Other" column constitutes goals and appearances in the Supercopa de España and the Copa de la Liga.

References 
Specific

General

External links
From official website:
Honours
Records
Appearances
Goalscorers

Records And Statistics
Athletic Bilbao
Records